Each branch of the British Armed Forces has its own uniform regulations. Many of these uniforms are also the template for those worn in the British cadet forces.

Uniforms of the British Army
Uniforms of the Royal Navy
Uniforms of the Royal Marines
Uniforms of the Royal Air Force

Uniforms overview

Headdress
Cap badges are worn on most types of headdress, with the exception of operational headdress (which is not usually worn in public).

Turbans
Turbans are worn by Sikh members of the British Armed Forces.

See also
 Cap comforter
 Royal Fleet Auxiliary#Uniforms
 Tactical recognition flash

References

 
Military equipment of the United Kingdom
Uniforms